Anna Vitalyevna Sorokina (born December 1, 1981, Vyazniki, Vladimir Oblast, RSFSR, Soviet Union) is a Russian biathlete, 2007 World champion in summer biathlon. Silver medalist of the (2009 Winter Universiade  (mass start at 12.5 km).  Master of Sports of Russia.

Anna Sorokina has been practicing biathlon since 1996. She lives near Tyumen. The sports soldier is trained by  Sergei Schestov, Olga Melnik,  and Leonid Guriev.

Anna graduated from the University of Tyumen in 2004.

She completed her sports career in 2012.

References

External links
 IBU Profile
 Statistics at Biathlonworld

1981 births
Living people
Tyumen State University alumni
Competitors at the 2009 Winter Universiade
Russian female biathletes
People from Vyazniki
Sportspeople from Vladimir Oblast